Anna Katharina von Offen (1624–1702), was a German courtier and royal governess. She served as Oberhofmeisterin  to Sophia of Hanover, and also served as governess to her children.

References
 Anke Hufschmidt: Adlige Frauen im Weserraum Zwischen 1570 und 1700, Veröffentlichungen der Historischen Kommission für Westfalen 22 15, 2001, S. 75, 

1624 births
1702 deaths
German ladies-in-waiting
Royal governesses